Franklin Geovany Flores Sacaza (born 18 May 1996) is a Honduran footballer who play for Real España in the top tier of football in Honduras.

Career

In 2017, Flores spent three months trialing with various clubs in the English Premier League as well as the English second division.

References

External links
 Franklin Flores at Soccerway

Honduran footballers
Living people
1996 births
Association football defenders
People from Atlántida Department
Honduras international footballers
C.D. Victoria players
Real C.D. España players
Liga Nacional de Fútbol Profesional de Honduras players